Chipo Tariro Chung (born 17 August 1977) is a Zimbabwean actress and activist based in London.

Early life and education
Chung was born as a refugee in Dar es Salaam, Tanzania. Her given name Chipo means "gift" in the Shona language. She spent her first two years in refugee camps in Mozambique with thousands of young people who were escaping the war in then-Rhodesia.

Chung was raised in Harare where she attended Dominican Convent High School and developed her acting with the mixed-race theater company Over the Edge. At eighteen, she moved to the United States where her mother Fay Chung was working for the United Nations. Fay Chung is an educationist and former minister of education in Zimbabwe.

Chung first studied directing at Yale University and then trained as an actor at the Royal Academy of Dramatic Art (RADA) in London, graduating in 2003.

Career
Chung’s stage debut was as Ophelia in a Nuffield Theatre production of Hamlet. Appearances in The Mayor of Zalamea and Ma Rainey’s Black Bottom at the Liverpool Everyman and Playhouse followed. She then appeared in Talking to Terrorists (Royal Court Theatre), The Overwhelming (Royal National Theatre) and Fallujah (in which she played Condoleezza Rice), as well as classical plays including Phedre, which was the first National Theatre Live recording, and starred Helen Mirren (Royal National Theatre).

She has appeared twice in Doctor Who, in one episode playing the Master's assistant Chantho and in another a character called the Fortune Teller. Her first film credit was as the voice of Icarus II in Danny Boyle's Sunshine. Other television appearances include the drama The Last Enemy and as a reporter in the Sherlock second series episode "The Hounds of Baskerville".

In 2011 she had a recurring role in the medieval romance drama series Camelot as Vivian, an indentured servant at King Uther's court who then works as an attendant and messenger for Morgan le Fay, played by Eva Green. She appeared in the first season of Sky Atlantic series Fortitude as Trish Stoddart. before winning the role of Mary Magdalene in the TV series, A.D. The Bible Continues. The show was hailed for its international and multiracial casting and opened to 11 million viewers in April 2015.

Chung then featured as the Master in AMC’s post-apocalyptic kung fu series Into the Badlands.

In 2017, Chung played Portia and Octavius in the Sheffield Theatre production of Julius Caesar, before taking on the title role of Dido, Queen of Carthage in the Royal Shakespeare Company's premiere production of Christopher Marlowe's tragedy. Michael Billington wrote in the Guardian she ‘plays [Dido] with a volatility and sense of contradiction that anticipates Shakespeare’s Cleopatra’.

In 2021, Chung joined the cast of HBO/ BBC co-production His Dark Materials playing the angel Xaphania. She features in a number of Apple TV+ series including Foundation and the upcoming Wool. In 2022, it was announced that she would be playing Eleanor Bennett in the Hulu series Black Cake, based on the best-selling novel by Charmaine Wilkerson. The series is produced by Oprah Winfrey’s Harpo Films and Aaron Kaplan’s Kapital Entertainment.

Chung reads a number of titles on Audible, most notably Glory by NoViolet Bulawayo, which was a 2022 finalist for the Booker Prize, as well as books by Petina Gappah and Tsitsi Dangarembgwa.

She was recognized as one of the BBC's 100 women of 2014. She was nominated for Best Actress at the Zimbabwe International Women’s Awards (ZIWA) in 2015 and honoured with a Special Recognition Award for her contribution to Media and the Arts at the Zimbabwe Achievers Awards in London in 2017.

Activism
Chung co-founded the charity SAFE-Kenya which develops theatre for social change in Kenya, focusing on HIV education and abandoning clitoridectomy. She worked closely with the charity Peace Direct to start Envision Zimbabwe, a women's trust that works towards consensus-building and peace in Zimbabwe. She also sits on the RADA Council and British Equity's International Committee for Artists' Freedom (ICAF).

In December 2019, along with 42 other cultural figures, Chung signed a letter endorsing the Labour Party under Jeremy Corbyn's leadership in the 2019 general election. The letter stated that "Labour's election manifesto under Jeremy Corbyn's leadership offers a transformative plan that prioritises the needs of people and the planet over private profit and the vested interests of a few."

In 2020, Chung co-chaired British Equity’s Independent Commission on Race Equality, and in 2022 founded the British charity Partnership on Rape Aftercare (PORA), which supports the Adult Rape Clinic in Zimbabwe.

Filmography

Mobile App

Film

Television

Video games

References

External links

Chipo Chung member page at the National Theatre
RADA Profile

1977 births
Living people
People from Dar es Salaam
Alumni of RADA
British film actresses
British stage actresses
British television actresses
British voice actresses
British actresses of Chinese descent
Yale University alumni
Alumni of Dominican Convent High School
Zimbabwean stage actresses
Zimbabwean emigrants to the United Kingdom
Zimbabwean expatriates in the United States
Zimbabwean people of Chinese descent
Zimbabwean film actresses
Zimbabwean television actresses
People from Harare
BBC 100 Women
Rhodesian people of Chinese descent
21st-century British actresses
21st-century Zimbabwean actresses
Zimbabwean expatriates in England
Zimbabwean refugees
Refugees in Tanzania
Refugees in Mozambique